Colonel James Rowell  (20 January 1851 – 6 July 1940) was an English-born Australian politician, soldier and horticulturalist. Born in Cambridge, he migrated to Australia as a child and was educated in state schools. He served in the military 1877–1917 before becoming aide-de-camp to the Governor-General. He was a horticulturalist, and served on West Torrens Council. In 1917, he was appointed to the Australian Senate as a Nationalist Senator for South Australia, filling the casual vacancy caused by the resignation of William Story, who was contesting the House of Representatives. He contested the 1922 election as a candidate for the Liberal Party, which was a group of disaffected Nationalists opposed to the leadership of Prime Minister Billy Hughes; he was defeated. Rowell died in 1940.

References

1851 births
1940 deaths
Australian Army officers
Australian military personnel of the Second Boer War
Australian military personnel of World War I
Australian orchardists
Companions of the Order of the Bath
English emigrants to colonial Australia
Members of the Australian Senate for South Australia
Nationalist Party of Australia members of the Parliament of Australia
People from Cambridge
Liberal Party (1922) members of the Parliament of Australia
20th-century Australian politicians